Draco norvillii, also known as Norvill's flying lizard, is species of agamid flying lizard endemic to India. It feeds on insects and other small invertebrates.

Etymology
The specific name, norvillii, is in honor F.H. Norville who was the collector of the holotype.

Taxonomy
Musters (1983) examined specimens of D. norvillii but was not able to examine the type. He opines that this lizard is a subspecies of Draco blanfordii. This view has not been endorsed in McGuire & Heang's (2001) study on the phylogenetic systematics of Southeast Asian flying lizards (Iguania: Agamidae: Draco).

Geographic range
Draco norvillii has been recorded from Assam, Nagaland, and Arunachal Pradesh in NE India. A rare and endangered species of lizard, it was described by Alcock and named after the collector of the type (F. H. Norvill) of Doom Dooma, Upper Assam (now Arunachal Pradesh). The type locality may be considered restricted to "North-eastern India, possibly Doom Dooma (27.57°N 95.57°E), Arunachal Pradesh, northeastern India".

D. norvillii was recently rediscovered after 118 years in the Jeypore Reserve Forest by Mazedul Islam and Professor Prasanta Kumar Saikia of the Animal Ecology and Wildlife Biology Laboratory of the Zoology Department, Gauhati University in 2012. Two lizards were recorded.

Description
Two individuals of D. norvillii, a female and juvenile, were encountered in Jeypore Reserve Forest in 2012 during a survey by biologists from Gauhati University.

Islam & Saikia describe the specimens as follows :
 Head: Broader than its length. Tympanum partially scaled over. The nostrils are inclined towards the vertical. Nine supralabial scales.
 Body: Grayish above. Middle portion of dorsal part barred with light transverse lines.  The neck and head regions were with greenish markings.  The tail was with alternate white and black bands.
 Throat: The base of the gular pouch was scarlet in colour. Gular appendage of female is yellow in colour and shorter than the head in length.
 Patagium: Female -  lower half red. Upper half black. Stippled with white and yellow broken lines and spots.  Supported by 5 ribs on each side. Greyish upper side and orange lower half in juveniles.
 Belly: Yellow. No caudal crest present.  Tail denticulated towards latter side. 
 Hind limbs: Possessing thorny scutes. 
 Measurements :
 Length Snout to Vent: 
 Length Tail: 
 Distance between the armpit to groin:

References

Further reading
 Alcock A. (1895). "On a New Species of Flying Lizard from Assam". J. Asiatic Soc. Bengal 64 (1): 14–15. (Draco norvillii, new species).

Lizards of Asia
norvillii
Reptiles of India
Endemic fauna of India
Reptiles described in 1895
Taxa named by Alfred William Alcock